Makhlouf Aït Hocine (born 17 November 1966) is an Algerian handball player. He competed in the 1988 Summer Olympics.

References

1966 births
Living people
Handball players at the 1988 Summer Olympics
Algerian male handball players
Olympic handball players of Algeria
21st-century Algerian people